The People's Republic of China competed at the 2011 World Championships in Athletics from August 27 to September 4 in Daegu, South Korea.

Team selection

A team of 58 athletes (including two substitutes) was
announced to represent the country in the event. The team was led by Olympic gold medalist and 2007 gold medalist at the world championships, 110 m hurdler Liu Xiang.

The following athletes appeared on the preliminary Entry List, but not on the Official Start List of the specific event, resulting in total number of 54 competitors:

Medalists
The following competitors from the People's Republic of China won a medal at the Championships

Results

Men

Women

References

External links
Official local organising committee website
Official IAAF competition website

Nations at the 2011 World Championships in Athletics
World Championships in Athletics
2011